Lash of the Whip is an American silent Western film released in 1924. It was written and directed by Francis Ford. The film is set in a remote town and features a ferry captain trying to keep a railroad executive and the woman accompanying him from surveying a route. A whip wielding hero repeatedly comes to their aid. The film is viewable at the Library of Congress website.

It was the first in a series of four films by the Arrow Film Corporation.

The film features rocky cliffs, desert scenery, a scenic town, and 1920s era autos as well as fisticuffs and horseback riding.

Cast
 Ashton Dearholt as "Pinto" Pete
 Harry Dunkinson as His Sidekick
 Florence Gilbert as Florence
 Francis Ford as "Hurricane" Smith
 Frank Baker as Frank Blake

References

External links
  at Library of Congress
 

1924 films
Arrow Film Corporation films
Films directed by Francis Ford
1924 Western (genre) films
Silent American Western (genre) films
1920s English-language films
1920s American films